The Somerset Hills is known as the northern region of Somerset County located in the U.S. state of New Jersey and includes the municipalities of Bedminster, Bernardsville, Bernards Township, Far Hills, Peapack & Gladstone. The Morris County communities of the Chesters (borough and township) and the Mendhams (borough and township) are often considered part of the Somerset Hills.

The Somerset Hills is in the northern section of Somerset County that was created on May 14, 1688, from portions of Middlesex County.

The term was coined in the early 1800s and references the 2nd Watchung Mountain which crosses Bedminster as well as the Bernardsville Mountain that is the highest mountain in the region.

Geography

Adjacent municipalities 
Somerset Hills contains the following townships/boroughs:

Peapack, New Jersey  – north
Gladstone, New Jersey  – north
Bernards Township, New Jersey – east (Includes towns of Basking Ridge, Liberty Corner, W. Millington, Lyons)
Bernardsville, New Jersey – central
Bedminster, New Jersey – west (Includes towns of Lamington, Pottersville, Pluckemin, Larger Cross, Lesser Cross
Far Hills, New Jersey –  central

Adjacent counties
Somerset County borders the following counties:
Morris County – north
Union County – east
Hunterdon County – west

Climate and weather
The county has a humid continental climate which is hot-summer (Dfa) except on Mine Mountain west of Bernardsville where it is warm-summer (Dfb).

History 
The Somerset Hills is the northern section of Somerset County, New Jersey and is part of one of America's oldest counties and is named after the English county of Somerset.  Most of the early residents were Dutch, Scottish and German. General George Washington and his troops marched through the area on several occasions and slept in many of the homes located throughout the area.

For much of its history, the Somerset Hills area was primarily an agricultural county. In the late 19th century, the Somerset Hills area became a popular country home location for wealthy industrialists. The area is still the home of wealthy pharmaceutical industrialists.

In the 1960s, townships that were once exclusively agricultural were quickly transformed into suburban communities.  This growth was aided by the development of the county's very strong pharmaceutical and technology presence. More recently, there has been an influx of New York City commuters who use NJ Transit's Gladstone Branch or use Interstate 78.

Historic events 
The Somerset Hills played host to a number of events that changed the course of history in the United States. The area hosted three winter encampments for the Continental Army during the Revolutionary War. The first was in 1776 in nearby Bernardsville and Morristown, and the other two were winter encampments in nearby Middlebrook. During the winter of 1778-1779 General Henry Knox and over 1000 artillery troops spent the winter in Pluckemin, New Jersey at what is now known as America's First Military Academy, created 28 years before the founding of the US Military Academy at West Point. Another notable events was the capture of General Charles Lee at the Widow White's tavern in Basking Ridge on December 13, 1776. If it were not for this capture, Lee might have been selected the "father of our country."

In 1779, General Washington wrote General William Alexander, the Earl of Stirling to construct a series of signal beacons to warn the continental army if there was detected movement of the British troops moving west from New York City and Staten Island. This chain of beacons proved effective during the battle of Springfield. These Rev War beacons were remembered during the 225th anniversary of the British Evacuation day on November 25, 2008.

Historic landmarks
The northern section of Somerset County in the Somerset Hills is rich in history dating back prior to the Revolutionary War.

Bedminster
Hamilton Farm Stable Complex
Jacobus Vanderveer House
Lamington Historic District
McDonald's-Kline's Mill
Pluckemin Continental Artillery Cantonment Site
Pluckemin Village Historic District
Pottersville Village Historic District
Bernards Township
Alward Farmhouse
Basking Ridge Presbyterian Church
Brick Academy
Basking Ridge Historic District
Coffee House
Franklin Corners Historic District
Kennedy Martin Stelle Farmstead - Bernards Township
Liberty Corner Historic District (Annin's Corner)
Lord Stirling Manor Site
Lyons Veterans Administration Hospital Historic District
Lyons Train Station - Lyons section of Bernards Township
Boudinout, Southard, Ross Farmstead - Basking Ridge Section of Bernards Township
Bernardsville
Bernardsville Train Station - Bernardsville
John Parker Tavern
Olcott Historic District
Reynolds-Scherman House
St. Bernard's Church and Parish House
Far Hills
Far Hills Train Station
Peapack
Peapack Train Station
Gladstone
Gladstone Train Station

Parks and recreation
Somerset County parks include Lord Stirling Park (part of the Great Swamp National Wildlife Refuge), the Environmental Education Commission and the region is one of the largest equestrian areas in the United States. Home to the United States Equestrian Team Foundation next to the Hamilton Farm Golf Club, the area has one of the oldest fox hunting organizations, the Essex Hunt Club in Peapack, New Jersey.

Trump National Golf Club in Bedminster is an exclusive golf club owned by Donald Trump. The facility has also served as the 45th President's Summer Whitehouse. Two other golf clubs are the Somerset Hills Country Club in Bernardsville, and Fiddlers Elbow Country Club in Bedminster, New Jersey. The United States Golfing Association (USGA) and museum is also located in Bernards Township, New Jersey.

One of the largest equestrian events in the United States is the Far Hills Race Meeting held annually in Far Hills, New Jersey. Known also as "The Hunt" it is one of the most prestigious steeplechase races in the United States. It is also one of the largest events in the county as the borough grows to over 25,000 (5th largest city in New Jersey)  on the October Saturday. In 2020, the FHRM will celebrate its 100th running.

Government

While part of Somerset County, each of the Somerset Hills townships are governed by their own separate government bodies. However, there are a number of shared government services that are shared between townships in the Somerset Hills. Somerset County is governed by a five-member Board of Chosen Freeholders, whose members are elected at-large to three-year terms of office on a staggered basis, with one or two seats coming up for election each year. At the federal level, the towns are all located within New Jersey's 7th congressional district.

Businesses
With access to routes 287 and 78, NJT rails service via the Gladstone Line, the area has shown a viable rural employment area. Companies that call the Somerset Hills home include:

 Bernards Township 
 Affinity Credit Union 
 Collabera 
 Daiichi Sankyo 
 Everest Reinsurance 
 Fedway Associates (Distributor) 
 Optum 
 United Health Group 
 Verizon Wireless 
 Bedminster 
 AT&T 
 Mallinckrodt Pharmaceuticals 
 Peapack/Gladstone 
 Pfizer Pharma 
 Matheny Medical & Educational Center

Education
Townships within the Somerset Hills are overseen by individual public schools for elementary thru middle school. The Somerset Hills area is home to two public high schools:

Ridge High School, Bernards Township
Somerset Hills Regional High School. Bernardsville supports public school students from Bedminster, Bernardsville, Far Hills, Peapack & Gladstone

Private education facilities:

 Somerset Hills Learning Institute, founded in 1998 and now located in Bedminster Township, is a state-of-the-art program dedicated to educating children on the autism spectrum by utilizing the principles of applied behavior analysis.
 The Bonnie Brae School - Bernards Township, New Jersey
The Matheny School - Peapack, New Jersey
 The Lord Stirling School - Bernards Township, New Jersey
 The Pingry School - Bernards Township, New Jersey
Gill St. Bernards School - Gladstone, New Jersey
 The Albrook School - Bernards Township, New Jersey
 Far Hills Country Day School - Far Hills, New Jersey
 Somerset Hills Montessori School - Bernards Township, New Jersey
The Willow School - Gladstone, New Jersey

Municipalities
Municipalities in the Somerset Hills (with 2010 Census data for population, housing units and area) are listed below.

Transportation

Roads and highways
The Somerset Hills area is served by a number of different routes. U.S. Routes include U.S. Route 202 and U.S. Route 206. The two Interstates that pass through are Interstate 78 and Interstate 287.

Public transportation

NJ Transit provides train service on the Gladstone Branch Public bus transportation is provided by several transit agencies.

NJ Transit provides bus service to the Port Authority Bus Terminal in Midtown Manhattan, as well as service to major cities in New Jersey and within Somerset County. Ridewise provides three SCOOT shuttles as well as DASH buses and CAT buses.

Airports 
There three closest airports are the Somerset Airport (small plane) in Bedminster, Morristown Airport (Mid) and Newark Liberty International Airport in Newark, New Jersey

Attractions
AAUW of the Somerset Hills
Mr Local History Research Non-Profit Project
Charter Day, Basking Ridge
Environmental Education Center (Great Swamp)
Far Hills Race Meeting
Hills Development
Leonard J. Buck Gardens
Lord Stirling Stables (Riding Lessons/Rentals)
Natarir County Park and estate
National Register of Historic Places listings in Somerset County, New Jersey
Ross Farm Music Series
Raptor Trust Bird Sanctuary
Somerset Hills YMCA
Somerset Hills Country Club
Trilogy Repertory Community Theater
Trump National Golf Club of Bedminster
VNA Rummage Sale

References

External links
Mr Local History Research Non-Profit Project
In the Somerset Hills Vol1 & Vol2
In the Somerset Hills - The Landed Gentry
History of the Somerset Hills Country Club
Somerset County website
Somerset County National Historic Places
Somerset County Parks Commission
Hills List is a local informational website for the Bedminster and Basking Ridge areas
Tale of Two Bedminsters (New Jersey and England)
Thinking of Living in Bedminster, New Jersey - NY Times
Thinking of Living in Basking Ridge, New Jersey - NY Times

Somerset County, New Jersey
1688 establishments in New Jersey
Central Jersey
Counties in the New York metropolitan area
Populated places established in 1688